Sparrow is the fourth studio album by American country music artist Ashley Monroe, released on April 20, 2018, through Warner Bros. Nashville. The album is produced by Dave Cobb and recorded in the iconic RCA Studio A.

Background
In an interview with Rolling Stone, Monroe said "I knew I wanted to work with Dave; all of his records are consistently awesome and classic, timeless, old and new all in one". Monroe also teamed with notable writer-artists Brendan Benson and Waylon Payne, including on the seductive "Wild Love", and with longtime friends Angaleena Presley and Anderson East, recording the album while pregnant with son Dalton, who was born in August 2017. In a press release to CMT she stated "To me, this record is about acknowledging past hurt, forgiveness and freedom to move forward. The most terrible things that happen to you are the most beautiful songs. That's what I respect most about music."

Sonically, Monroe lists country pop-oriented material by Glen Campbell, Shelby Lynne, Waylon Jennings and Elvis Presley as influences, particularly for their use of strings. She also mentioned listening to albums by Elton John and Rick Hall during recording.

Critical reception

Sparrow received widespread acclaim from music critics. At Metacritic, which assigns a normalized rating out of 100 to reviews from mainstream critics, the album has an average score of 86, based on 8 reviews, indicating "universal acclaim". Stephen Thomas Erlewine of AllMusic called it "sharply constructed as an album, setting a mood with its first song and then finding variations on this lush, enveloping sound." Thierry Côté from Exclaim! concluded his review saying "she has crafted a captivating Southern Gothic country-soul masterpiece, one that can stand proudly next to the timeless works that inspired it. There may not be a better record to come out of Nashville in 2018."

Commercial performance
The album debuted at No. 21 on Billboards Top Country Albums, selling 4,900 copies in the first week. It has sold 8,000 copies in the United States as of June 2018.

Track listing
Credits adapted from Rolling Stone.

Personnel
Credits adapted from AllMusic.

Musicians

 Brian Allen – bass, cello
 David Angel – violin
 Dave Cobb – acoustic guitar, electric guitar, percussion, production
 David Davidson – violin
 Cris Lacy – A&R
 Ashley Monroe – vocals, Mellotron
 Waylon Payne – backing vocals
 Chris Powell – drums, percussion
 Carole Rabinowitz – cello
 Kristin Wilkinson – string arrangements, viola
 Karen Winklemann – violin

Technical personnel

 Hannah Burton – photography
 Gena Johnson – engineering assistance
 Mike Moore – art direction, design
 Eddie Spear – engineering
 Shane Tarleton – creative direction

Charts

Release history

References

Ashley Monroe albums
2018 albums
Warner Records albums
Albums produced by Dave Cobb